is a railway station on the Iida Line in the city of Ina,  Nagano Prefecture, Japan, operated by Central Japan Railway Company (JR Central).

Lines
Akagi Station is served by the Iida Line and is 170.4 kilometers from the starting point of the line at Toyohashi Station.

Station layout
The station consists of one ground-level side platform serving a single bi-directional track. There is no station building, but only a shelter on the platform. The station is unattended.

Adjacent stations

History
Akagi Station opened on 27 December 1913. With the privatization of Japanese National Railways (JNR) on 1 April 1987, the station came under the control of JR Central. The station building was rebuilt in 1990.

Passenger statistics
In fiscal 2015, the station was used by an average of 60 passengers daily (boarding passengers only).

Surrounding area

See also
 List of railway stations in Japan

References

External links
 Akagi Station information 

Railway stations in Nagano Prefecture
Railway stations in Japan opened in 1913
Stations of Central Japan Railway Company
Iida Line
Ina, Nagano